The Indonesia national badminton team represents Indonesia in international badminton team competitions and is controlled by the Badminton Association of Indonesia, the governing body for badminton in Indonesia. Indonesia is one of the only two countries beside China who has won all badminton discipline in the Olympic Games.

The Indonesian team has not been absent from the Thomas Cup tournament (world men's team championship) since it first entered and won the competition in 1958. The Indonesia men's team has participated in Thomas Cup 28 times, won the title 14 times and never failed to qualify for inter-zone competition. Indonesia has played in the decisive final tie on 21 occasions and never failed to place among the top four teams, except in 2012.

The Indonesia women's team has participated in Uber Cup 25 times, won the title 3 times and once failed to qualify in 2006. Indonesia has played in the decisive final tie on 10 occasions.

The Indonesia mixed team has won Sudirman Cup once in 1989. Indonesia has played in the decisive final tie on 7 occasions.

Summer Olympic Games

List of medalists

Participation in World Badminton Championships
The BWF World Championships (formerly known as IBF World Championships, also known as the World Badminton Championships) is a badminton tournament sanctioned by Badminton World Federation (BWF).
The tournament started in 1977 and was held once every three years until 1983. Below is the gold medalists shown based by category and countries after the 2013 Championships. China has been the most successful in the World Championships ever since its inception in 1977. From 1977 up to 2001, the medals were usually divided among five countries, namely Indonesia, China, Korea, Denmark, Malaysia. However, in 2003, the winners included seven countries and in 2005 the medal board contained a record high of ten countries. Indonesians Tony Gunawan also bears the distinction of winning a gold medal in Men's Doubles, representing two different countries, 2001 partnering with Halim Haryanto for Indonesia and in 2005 partnering with Howard Bach to give the United States its first medal in the competition.

Participation in Thomas Cup, Uber Cup and Sudirman Cup
Indonesia leads in total titles with fourteen. It won four consecutive titles from 1970 through 1979 and five consecutive titles from 1994 through 2002. Indonesia's ten-year reign as Champions was ended by the resurgence of China in 2004 when the Chinese won the title in Jakarta. Indonesia has played in the decisive final tie (men's team match) on nineteen occasions. Since the Thomas Cup format was overhauled in 1984, it has failed to place among the top four teams only once, in 2012.

Thomas Cup

Uber Cup

Sudirman Cup

**Red border color indicates tournament was held on home soil.

Squads

Thomas Cup

Uber Cup

Sudirman Cup
2021
 MS: Jonatan Christie, Anthony Sinisuka Ginting, Shesar Hiren Rhustavito
 WS: Gregoria Mariska Tunjung, Ester Nurumi Tri Wardoyo, Putri Kusuma Wardani
 MD: Mohammad Ahsan, Fajar Alfian, Muhammad Rian Ardianto, Marcus Fernaldi Gideon, Hendra Setiawan, Kevin Sanjaya Sukamuljo
 WD: Greysia Polii, Apriyani Rahayu, Siti Fadia Silva Ramadhanti, Ribka Sugiarto
 XD: Praveen Jordan, Pitha Haningtyas Mentari, Melati Daeva Oktavianti, Rinov Rivaldy

2019
 MS: Jonatan Christie, Anthony Sinisuka Ginting, Shesar Hiren Rhustavito
 WS: Fitriani, Gregoria Mariska Tunjung, 
 MD: Mohammad Ahsan, Fajar Alfian, Muhammad Rian Ardianto, Marcus Fernaldi Gideon, Hendra Setiawan, Kevin Sanjaya Sukamuljo
 WD: Ni Ketut Mahadewi Istarani, Greysia Polii, Apriyani Rahayu
 XD: Tontowi Ahmad, Hafiz Faizal, Praveen Jordan, Winny Oktavina Kandow, Melati Daeva Oktavianti, Gloria Emanuelle Widjaja

2017
MS : Jonatan Christie, Anthony Sinisuka Ginting
WS : Dinar Dyah Ayustine, Fitriani, Gregoria Mariska Tunjung,
MD : Mohammad Ahsan, Marcus Fernaldi Gideon, Angga Pratama, Rian Agung Saputra, Kevin Sanjaya Sukamuljo, Ricky Karanda Suwardi
WD : Anggia Shitta Awanda, Della Destiara Haris, Greysia Polii, Rosyita Eka Putri Sari, Apriani Rahayu
XD : Tontowi Ahmad, Praveen Jordan, Debby Susanto, Gloria Emanuelle Widjaja

2015
MS : Jonatan Christie, Firman Abdul Kholik, Ihsan Maulana Mustofa
WS : Lindaweni Fanetri, Bellaetrix Manuputty, Hanna Ramadini
MD : Mohammad Ahsan, Marcus Fernaldi Gideon, Angga Pratama, Hendra Setiawan, Kevin Sanjaya Sukamuljo, Ricky Karanda Suwardi
WD : Anggia Shitta Awanda, Della Destiara Haris, Nitya Krishinda Maheswari, Greysia Polii
XD : Tontowi Ahmad, Praveen Jordan, Liliyana Natsir, Debby Susanto

2013
MS : Dionysius Hayom Rumbaka, Tommy Sugiarto
WS : Lindaweni Fanetri, Bellaetrix Manuputty, Aprilia Yuswandari
MD : Mohammad Ahsan, Angga Pratama, Ryan Agung Saputra, Hendra Setiawan
WD : Gebby Ristiyani Imawan, Meiliana Jauhari, Nitya Krishinda Maheswari, Tiara Rosalia Nuraidah, Greysia Polii
XD : Tontowi Ahmad, Fran Kurniawan, Liliyana Natsir, Muhammad Rijal, Debby Susanto

2011
MS : Taufik Hidayat, Dionysius Hayom Rumbaka, Simon Santoso
WS : Lindaweni Fanetri, Adriyanti Firdasari
MD : Mohammad Ahsan, Alvent Yulianto Chandra, Hendra Aprida Gunawan, Bona Septano
WD : Anneke Feinya Agustin, Meiliana Jauhari, Nitya Krishinda Maheswari, Greysia Polii
XD : Tontowi Ahmad, Pia Zebadiah Bernadet, Fran Kurniawan, Liliyana Natsir, Debby Susanto

2009
MS : Sony Dwi Kuncoro, Simon Santoso, Tommy Sugiarto
WS : Adriyanti Firdasari, Maria Kristin Yulianti
MD : Mohammad Ahsan, Yonathan Suryatama Dasuki, Markis Kido, Bona Septano, Hendra Setiawan, Rian Sukmawan
WD : Shendy Puspa Irawati, Meiliana Jauhari, Nitya Krishinda Maheswari, Greysia Polii
XD : Devin Lahardi Fitriawan, Fran Kurniawan, Liliyana Natsir, Lita Nurlita, Nova Widianto

2007
MS : Simon Santoso, Sony Dwi Kuncoro, Taufik Hidayat
WS : Adriyanti Firdasari, Maria Kristin Yulianti, Pia Zebadiah Bernadet
MD : Alvent Yulianto, Candra Wijaya, Hendra Aprida Gunawan, Hendra Setiawan, Joko Riyadi, Luluk Hadiyanto, Markis Kido
WD : Greysia Polii, Lita Nurlita, Rani Mundiasti, Vita Marissa
XD : Flandy Limpele, Muhammad Rijal, Nova Widianto, Endang Nursugianti, Liliyana Natsir
2005
MS : Simon Santoso, Sony Dwi Kuncoro, Taufik Hidayat
WS : Adriyanti Firdasari, Fransisca Ratnasari
MD : Alvent Yulianto, Candra Wijaya, Flandy Limpele, Luluk Hadiyanto, Sigit Budiarto
WD : Greysia Polii, Jo Novita, Lita Nurlita
XD : Nova Widianto, Liliyana Natsir, Yunita Tetty
2003
MS : Budi Santoso, Sony Dwi Kuncoro, Taufik Hidayat
WS : Dewi Tira Arisandi, Maria Kristin Yulianti
MD : Alvent Yulianto, Candra Wijaya, Halim Haryanto, Luluk Hadiyanto, Sigit Budiarto
WD : Eny Erlangga, Jo Novita, Liliyana Natsir, Lita Nurlita
XD : Nova Widianto, Tri Kusharjanto, Emma Ermawati, Vita Marissa
2001
MS : Budi Santoso, Hendrawan, Rony Agustinus, Taufik Hidayat
WS : Lidya Djaelawijaya, Yuli Marfuah
MD : Candra Wijaya, Eng Hian, Flandy Limpele, Halim Haryanto, Sigit Budiarto, Tony Gunawan
WD : Deyana Lomban, Etty Tantri, Indarti Issolina, Vita Marissa
XD : Bambang Suprianto, Nova Widianto, Tri Kusharjanto, Minarti Timur
1999
MS : Hendrawan, Taufik Hidayat
WS : Ellen Angelina, Lidya Djaelawijaya, Cindana Hartono Kusuma
MD : Tony Gunawan, Eng Hian, Flandy Limpele, Rexy Mainaky, Ricky Subagja, Candra Wijaya
WD : Carmelita, Indarti Issolina, Deyana Lomban, Etty Tantri, Cynthia Tuwankotta
XD : Tri Kusharjanto, Bambang Suprianto, Zelin Resiana, Minarti Timur
1997
MS : Hariyanto Arbi, Alan Budikusuma, Joko Suprianto, Ardy Wiranata
WS : Mia Audina, Susi Susanti
MD : Antonius Ariantho, Sigit Budiarto, Denny Kantono, Rexy Mainaky, Ricky Subagja, Candra Wijaya
WD : Indarti Issolina, Deyana Lomban, Eliza Nathanael, Zelin Resiana
XD : Flandy Limpele, Tri Kusharjanto, Emma Ermawati, Minarti Timur
1995
MS : Hariyanto Arbi, Ardy Wiranata
WS : Mia Audina, Susi Susanti
MD : Rudy Gunawan, Rexy Mainaky, Ricky Subagja, Bambang Suprianto
WD : Eliza Nathanael, Finarsih, Lili Tampi, Zelin Resiana
XD : Tri Kusharjanto, Aryono Miranat, Minarti Timur
1993
MS : Hariyanto Arbi, Alan Budikusuma, Joko Suprianto, Ardy Wiranata
WS : Minarti Timur, Sarwendah Kusumawardhani, Susi Susanti
MD : Rudy Gunawan, Ricky Subagja, Bambang Suprianto
WD : Eliza Nathanael, Finarsih, Lili Tampi, Zelin Resiana
XD : Denny Kantono, Aryono Miranat, Rosiana Tendean
1991
MS : Alan Budikusuma, Fung Permadi, Bambang Suprianto, Joko Suprianto, Hermawan Susanto, Ardy Wiranata
WS : Yuni Kartika, Sarwendah Kusumawardhani, Yuliani Sentosa, Lilik Sudarwati, Susi Susanti
MD : Rudy Gunawan, Eddy Hartono, Imay Hendra, Rexy Mainaky, Bagus Setiadi, Ricky Subagja
WD : Catherine, Finarsih, Eliza Nathanael, Erma Sulistyaningsih, Lili Tampi, Rosiana Tendean
1989
MS : Eddy Kurniawan, Icuk Sugiarto
WS : Sarwendah Kusumawardhani, Susi Susanti
MD : Eddy Hartono, Rudy Gunawan
WD : Verawaty Fadjrin, Yanti Kusmiati
XD : Aryono Miranat, Minarti Timur

Asian Games

Men's team competition
1962 – Winner
1970 – Winner
1974 – Runner-up
1978 – Winner
1982 – Runner-up
1986 – Semi-finalist
1990 – Semi-finalist
1994 – Winner
1998 – Winner
2002 – Runner-up
2006 – Semi-finalist
2010 – Semi-finalist
2014 – Quarter-finalist
2018 – Runner-up

Women's team competition
1962 – Winner
1966 – Semi-finalist
1970 – Semi-finalist
1974 – Runner-up
1978 – Runner-up
1986 – Semi-finalist
1990 – Runner-up
1994 – Runner-up
1998 – Semi-finalist
2006 – Group stage
2010 – Semi-finalist
2014 – Quarter-finalist
2018 – Semi-finalist

Participation in Badminton Asia Championships

Individual competition

BOLD highlights the overall winner therefore at that Asia Team Championships

 Indonesia won on superior of silver medal, thus, Indonesia became overall winner.
  China won on superior of silver medal to Korea, thus, China became overall winner.
 China won on superior of silver medal of three silver medals to Malaysia none, thus, China became overall winner.
 Indonesia won on superior of silver medal of four silver medals to South Korea one, thus, Indonesia became overall winner.
 China won on superior of silver medal of two silver medals to South Korea none, thus, China became overall winner.
 China won on superior of bronze medal of four bronze medals to South Korea one, thus, China became overall winner.
 China won on superior of bronze medal of four bronze medals to Japan none, thus, China became overall winner.

Men's team

Participation in Badminton Asia Team Championships 

Men's team

Women's team

Mixed team

Southeast Asian Games

Team competition

Men's doubles supremacy

Even though they actually have a balance of strength in all events, they are known for producing many great doubles in the men's category. Their doubles had conquered the Olympic Gold Medal, World Champion titles, All Englands and many open titles over decades. Among their greats are Tjun Tjun, Christian Hadinata, Eddie Hartono, Rexy Mainaky, Ricky Subagja, Chandra Wijaya, Tony Gunawan, Sigit Budiarto, Markis Kido and Hendra Setiawan. Despite their domination, the national badminton governing body is also known for their awkward splitting decision. It happened twice in the Thomas Cup and thrice in the Olympics. Indonesia leads in total titles with fourteen. It won four consecutive titles from 1970 through 1979 and five consecutive titles from 1994 through 2002. Indonesia's ten-year reign as champions was ended by the resurgence of China in 2004 when the Chinese won the title in Jakarta. Indonesia has played in the decisive final tie (team match) on eighteen occasions. Since the Thomas Cup format was overhauled in 1984, it has failed to place among the top four teams only once, in 2012.
In 1986, they chose to field King/Ertanto instead of the more solid King/Kartono, considering that Kartono always played badly against the Chinese. In 2004, they fielded weak doubles against strong Danish pairs. Because of those decisions, they lost the match. As for the Olympics, they didn't do anything to maintain the Halim/Tony partnership and Tony G quit the national team. They also split the Candra/Sigit combination months before the 2004 Games. Four years later in Beijing they deselected Tony G/Candra in favor of Luluk/Alvent. For the London Games, the same thing repeated once more due to their decision in deceiving reigning Olympics Gold Medalists Markis/Hendra. The 2005 edition also brought new faces in the mixed doubles event which had been dominated by China and Korea since 1997. With the retirement of defending champions and two-time winners Kim Dong-moon/Ra Kyung-min (Korea), Nova Widianto/Lilyana Natsir won Indonesia's first mixed doubles gold since 1980 when Christian Hadinata/Imelda Wiguna won it last for Indonesia. In 2020 after almost 20 years, Indonesia managed to become the champion of the Thomas Cup for the 14th time. This 14th title makes Indonesia the country with the most Thomas Cup titles.

References

Badminton
National badminton teams
Badminton in Indonesia